Sajjad Hayder Rizvi is an intellectual historian and professor of Islamic intellectual history and Islamic studies at the University of Exeter.

Biography
Rizvi completed his BA and MA in modern history, as well as his MPhil in modern middle East studies from the University of Oxford. He received his PhD in Oriental studies from the University of Cambridge. Rizvi worked as a lecturer at the University of Bristol before moving to the University of Exeter, where he is now a professor of Islamic intellectual history.

Works
 Mulla Sadra and Metaphysics: Modulation of Being
 Mullā Ṣadrā Shīrāzī: His Life and Works and the Sources for Safavid Philosophy

See also
 Mohammed Rustom

References

Year of birth missing (living people)
Intellectual historians
Living people
Alumni of the University of Oxford
Alumni of the University of Cambridge
University of Exeter
Muslim scholars of Islamic studies